The following is a list of cricket video games.

See also
 Sports game

References